The Yankee Institute for Public Policy is a free market, limited government American think tank based in Hartford, Connecticut, that researches Connecticut public policy questions. Organized as a 501(c)(3), the group's stated mission is to "develop and advocate for free market, limited government public policy solutions in Connecticut." Yankee was founded in 1984 by Bernard Zimmern, a French entrepreneur who was living in Norwalk, Connecticut, and Professor Gerald Gunderson of Trinity College. The organization is a member of the State Policy Network.

Public policy research

Tax and budget
The Yankee Institute has had a historic focus on Connecticut's tax and budget issues.  In 1991, during the debate over the adoption of a state income tax, it published “A Connecticut Assessment of State Income Taxation: Fueling the Government, Stalling the Economy” by Thomas Dye, a professor at Florida State University, about the likely impact of an income tax on the state's economic growth.

The 2010 Yankee publication Connecticut Taxes and Fees was highlighted by the Hartford Courant as "a look at how many ways the government collects money from the citizens it serves."

Government transparency
Government accountability and transparency research have emerged as key areas of interest for the Yankee Institute. In 2010, the organization launched the Connecticut Sunlight Project to monitor government spending. The Hartford Courant praised the site, writing, "All hail the latest popular electronic plaything, a website, www.ctsunlight.org, launched by the Yankee Institute, a libertarian Connecticut think tank, that tells you everything you want to know about the state budget."

The CT Sunlight Project was expanded during the summer of 2010 to include payroll and pension data for local governments and school districts in Connecticut.

In July 2010, the Yankee Institute launched the investigative reporting project Raising Hale to "uncover wasteful government spending" and "expose government corruption and abuse."

Education
Education research has been a signature issue for the Yankee Institute starting with its organization of a conference on school choice at Trinity College in 1988. The organization has published numerous studies on the topic, including the December 2007 Ending Corruption and Waste in Your Public School by Dr. Armand Fusco, a retired superintendent of schools from the town of Branford, the report Free College for High School Students by Dr. Lewis Andrews, and the June 2009 How to Reduce Property Taxes with a Citizens' Audit Committee by Dr. Armand Fusco and Dr. Lewis Andrews.

Government administration and elections reform
Yankee research has delved into reforms of the state's campaign finance laws.  The Yankee Institute published Slanting the Playing Field: Connecticut's Flawed Financed Campaign System detailing the policy flaws in Connecticut's Citizens' Election Program, a publicly funded alternative campaign financing system available to candidates for state offices.

The Yankee Institute filed an amicus brief in the U.S. Supreme Court case McComish v. Bennett in November 2010.

References

External links
 
 Organizational Profile – National Center for Charitable Statistics (Urban Institute)
 EDIRC listing (provided by RePEc)
 Listing at Charity Navigator

Think tanks based in the United States
Non-profit organizations based in Connecticut
Think tanks established in 1984
Libertarian think tanks
Libertarian organizations based in the United States
Politics of Connecticut
East Hartford, Connecticut